van Heusden or Vanheusden is a surname. Notable people with the surname include:

Arjan van Heusden (born 1972), Dutch footballer
Els Vanheusden, Belgian physician and businesswoman
Wout van Heusden (1896-1982), Dutch graphic artist

Dutch-language surnames
Surnames of Dutch origin